The Honeywell TPE331 (military designation: T76) is a turboprop engine. It was originally designed in the 1950s by Garrett AiResearch, and produced since 1999 by Honeywell Aerospace.

Design and development
Garrett AiResearch designed the TPE331 from scratch in 1959 for the military. “Designed as a 575-horsepower engine it was not a scaled-down version of a larger engine, as competitors were offering.”
The TPE331 originated in 1961 as a gas turbine (the "331") to power helicopters. It first went into production in 1963. More than 700 had been shipped by the end of 1973. It was designed to be both a turboshaft (TSE331)  and a turboprop (TPE331), but the turboshaft version never went into production. The first engine was produced in 1963, installed on the Aero Commander in 1964 and put into production on the Aero Commander Turbo Commander in June 1965.

Performance

The 715 shp TPE331-6 used in the Beech King Air B100 have a 400-hr. fuel nozzle cleaning interval, 1,800-hr. hot section inspection interval and a 5,400-hr. time between overhaul; approval is possible for 3,000-hr. HSIs and 6,000-hr. overhauls and engine reserves are cheaper than for the PT6A.

Variants

Military variants (T76)

T76-G-2
T76-G-4
T76-G-6
T76-G-8
T76-G-10
T76-G-12
T76-G-12A
T76-G-14
T76-G-16
T76-G-410
T76-G-411
T76-G-416
T76-G-417
T76-G-418
T76-G-419
T76-G-420
T76-G-421

Commercial variants (TPE331)

Applications

Fitted with TPE-331s as a replacement for their original engines

Specifications

See also

References

Bibliography

External links

 TPE 331 Cost Protection Programs
 TPE 331 Engine Conversions
 Power and fuel flow versus altitude and speed, for version 10.  (Archive)

1960s turboprop engines

TPE331